The Rethe is a waterway in the Port of Hamburg, Germany.

It is located in Wilhelmsburg between the islands Hohe Schaar and Neuhof. It connects the Reiherstieg basin with the Köhlbrand.

It is bridged by the Rethe Lift Bridge.

See also
List of rivers of Hamburg

Rivers of Hamburg
0Rethe
Rivers of Germany